Yuliya Aleksandrovna Levina (born  2 January 1973, in Saratov) is a Russian rower who competed for Russia in four Summer Olympics.

In 2000, she was a crew member of the Russia boat which won the bronze medal in the quadruple sculls event.

External links
profile

1973 births
Living people
Russian female rowers
Olympic rowers of Russia
Rowers at the 2000 Summer Olympics
Rowers at the 2004 Summer Olympics
Rowers at the 2008 Summer Olympics
Rowers at the 2012 Summer Olympics
Olympic bronze medalists for Russia
Sportspeople from Saratov
Olympic medalists in rowing
Medalists at the 2000 Summer Olympics
World Rowing Championships medalists for Russia
20th-century Russian women
21st-century Russian women